The Licensed Trade Charity (LTC) is a registered charity in the United Kingdom that cares for people working in, or retired from, the licensed drink trade and their dependents.

It is constituted as a registered charity under English law, and its headquarters are in Ascot, Berkshire.

It was founded by a royal charter of 3 May 1836 as the Society of Licensed Victuallers and adopted the working name Licensed Trade Charity in 2004 following a merger with the Licensed Victuallers National Homes charity.

Activities
Amongst the activities of the charity are the provision of financial assistance, convalescence care and retirement housing. It is a shareholder in the publisher of the Morning Advertiser, the journal of the licensed trade.

Schools
The Licensed Trade Charity operates three schools which are also open to the general public: Licensed Victuallers' School near Ascot, Berkshire, an independent all-ability school for students from 4–18, as well as LVS Hassocks and LVS Oxford, both specialist schools for young people with learning difficulties.

See also
 List of organisations in the United Kingdom with a royal charter
 List of organisations with a British royal charter
 Worshipful Company of Innholders

References

External links
 Licensed Trade Charity website
 Morning Advertiser website

Charities based in Berkshire
1836 establishments in the United Kingdom
Social welfare charities based in the United Kingdom